Roberto Garcia Lachner (born February 1, 1977) is a former USMS Marathon Distance Open Water National Champion   (Male 40 to 44 age group) and winner of his age-group division at the 5 km open water swimming race at the  2018 Pan American Masters Championships in Daytona Beach, Florida. As a youth swimmer, Garcia trained under the guidance of six-time Olympic coach Michael Lohberg  at the Coral Springs Aquatic & Sports Complex in Coral Springs, Florida. He was named twice by the Florida Gold Coast Swimming Organization a Top 10 Age Group Swimmer in 1988 and 1989 and has competed in numerous amateur road races, marathons and long-distance triathlons across the globe.

References

External links

 International Triathlon Union athlete profile
 U.S. Masters Swimming swimmer profile
 World Openwater Swimming Association

1977 births
Living people
American male swimmers